ERA Forum is a quarterly law journal published by Springer Science+Business Media on behalf of the Academy of European Law. The journal contains articles from presentations delivered at ERA’s conferences. Most articles are published in English; however, articles in French and German are also included with English abstracts.

External links 
 

Law journals
Springer Science+Business Media academic journals
Publications established in 2000
Quarterly journals
Multilingual journals